The Picture of Dorian Gray is a 1916 British silent fantasy film directed by Fred W. Durrant and starring Henry Victor, Pat O'Malley and Sydney Bland.  The film is based on the 1890 novel The Picture of Dorian Gray by Oscar Wilde.

Plot summary

Cast
 Henry Victor - Dorian Gray 
 Pat O'Malley - Sibyl Vane 
 Sydney Bland - Basil Hallward 
 Dorothy Fane - Lady Marchmont 
 Jack Jordan - Lord Henry Wootton 
 Douglas Cox - James Vane 
 A.B. Imeson - Satan 
 Miriam Ferris
 Edmund Goulding

See also
 Adaptations of The Picture of Dorian Gray

Bibliography
 Kohl, Norbert. Oscar Wilde: The Works of a Conformist Rebel. Cambridge University Press, 1989.

References

External links
 
 

1916 films
British fantasy films
1910s English-language films
Films set in England
British silent feature films
1910s fantasy films
Films based on The Picture of Dorian Gray
British black-and-white films
1910s British films
Silent horror films